James Collins was an English professional footballer who played as a winger. He played in the Football League for Cardiff City.

References

Year of birth missing
Date of death missing
English footballers
Liverpool F.C. players
Cardiff City F.C. players
Millwall F.C. players
Bangor City F.C. players
English Football League players
Association football wingers